Suburban Romance is a 1958 Czechoslovak romance film directed by Zbyněk Brynych. It was entered into the 1958 Cannes Film Festival.

Cast
 Jana Brejchová
 Eduard Cupák
 František Kreuzmann
 Václav Lohniský as Poláček
 Antonín Novotný as Karel Freit
 Václav Poláček
 Svatopluk Skládal
 Eva Svobodová as Jarošová
 Jiří Vála

References

External links
 

1958 films
1950s Czech-language films
1950s romance films
Czechoslovak black-and-white films
Films directed by Zbyněk Brynych
Czech romantic films
1950s Czech films